Drumkeeran, also Drumkeerin, is a village and townland in County Leitrim, Ireland, located at the junction of the R280 and R200 roads. It is situated in drumlin hills at the foot of Corry Mountain, just north of Lough Allen.

History
Throughout at least the 19th and 20th centuries, a number of annual fairs were held at Drumkeeran on-  10 February, 8 March, 12 April, 27 May, 18 June (or 24th), 19 July, 18 August, 16 September, 19 October, 11 November, 9 December, and 22 December. In 1925, Drumkeerin village comprised 54 houses, 11 being licensed to sell alcohol.

Long ago Ireland had been covered in Woodland, a claim echoed in a 19th century survey of Leitrim- "". These great forests in Leitrim and on the west side of Lough Allen were denuded for the making for Charcoal for Iron works around Slieve Anierin.  Immense piles of cleared timber existed in this area in 1782.

Community organisations
The Drumkeerin Development Association was formed around 1970. In 1986, Drumkeerin Community Council was established to address the economic development of the village. In 1992, the Drumkeerin Tourist and Development Company was incorporated in order to effect plans of the Community Council.

Drumkeerin GAA club was founded in 1933 and represents the parish area of Inishmagrath.

Transport
Bus Éireann route 462 serves the village on Fridays providing links to Sligo and Manorhamilton. Route 469 serves the village on Saturdays providing a link to Drumshanbo, Carrick on Shannon and Longford.

Churches
Churches in the area include St Brigid's Roman Catholic church (built 1869), St Joseph's Church of Ireland church (1833), and St Patricia's Presbyterian church (1844).

See also
 List of towns and villages in Ireland

References

Notes

Sources

Towns and villages in County Leitrim
Townlands of County Leitrim